"Piccolo uomo" is a 1972 Italian song composed by  Dario Baldan Bembo (music), Bruno Lauzi and Michelangelo La Bionda (lyrics) and performed by Mia Martini. It was the singer's first significant commercial success.

Background
When Dario Baldan Bembo presented this ballad to Ricordi, he expected it to be recorded by the successful band I Camaleonti, but producer Giovanni Sanjust felt it was the right song to definitely launch the career of upcoming singer Mia Martini; this led to a great disagreement between the two, with Baldan Bembo even refusing to play Hammond organ in the Martini's audition. Following the success of the song, Baldan Bembo eventually became one of the closer collaborators and more trusted songwriters of Martini.

The title of the song came from an epithet the wife of the short-in-stature Bruno Lauzi used to call him.

The song was initially ignored by audience, being even eliminated by Un disco per l'estate selections. It was later presented at Festivalbar, turning into a big hit and winning the competition. It got Martini her first magazine cover, for the music magazine .

The song was recorded by Mia Martini in French (with the title "Tout petit homme"), German (as "Auf der welt") and Spanish (as "Pequeno hombre"). In 1973 Pop-Tops recorded an English-language cover of the song entitled "My Little Woman".

The B-side of the single is a cover of John Lennon's "Mother", with Italian lyrics by Martini.

Track listing

   7" single –  	SRL 10669 
 "Piccolo uomo" (Bruno Lauzi, Michelangelo La Bionda, Dario Baldan Bembo)
 "Madre" (John Lennon, Mia Martini)

Charts

References

External links 

1972 singles
Italian songs
1972 songs
Mia Martini songs
Songs written by Dario Baldan Bembo